Ilocos was a province in northern Luzon, Philippines that comprised the present-day provinces of Ilocos Norte, Ilocos Sur, parts of La Union, and Abra. On February 2, 1818, the province was split into Ilocos Norte and Ilocos Sur by the promulgation of a royal decree due to rapid population growth.

See also 
 Ilocos Norte
 Ilocos Sur
 Ilocos Region

References

History of the Ilocos Region
Former provinces of the Philippines

la:Regio Ilocana
ja:イロコス地方
simple:Ilocos